Grigorăuca is a commune in Sîngerei District, Moldova. It is composed of three villages: Cozești, Grigorăuca and Petropavlovca.

References

Communes of Sîngerei District